The Gateway Center is a commercial complex in Newark, New Jersey.  Located downtown just west of Newark Penn Station between Raymond Boulevard and Market Street; McCarter Highway runs through the complex. Skyways and pedestrian malls interconnect all of the office towers, a Hilton Hotel,  the train station, and the Newark Legal Center. Built in phases in the late 20th century the complex comprises some of the tallest buildings in the city, two designed by Victor Gruen Associates and two by Grad Associates.

History
The Gateway Center was conceived as part of the "New Newark". Built in an urban renewal area that was considered blighted it was an early attempt to restore the reputation and rejuvenate business in Newark which had experienced severe urban decay in the previous decade. Prudential Insurance originally committed $18 million of long-term financing. The first phase included Gateway One, a concourse and shopping mall, and the Downtowner Motor Inn, which later became a Hilton hotel. The second phase, Gateway Two, was offices of Western Electric Company.  The complex was self-contained, allowing tenants and visitors to remain within the interior.  A pedestrian mall one level above the street connected all parts of the complex connected to Penn Station by a glass-enclosed skywalk that extended over Raymond Plaza. Another skywalk extended across McCarter Highway to connect Gateway One and Gateway Two. The skywalks were intended to separate vehicular and pedestrian traffic and provided safety and security to wary commuters. These were completed by 1972.  Gateway Three and Gateway Four were completed in 1985 and 1988, respectively. Original plans called for a Gateway Five and a Gateway Six, but are unbuilt, the available land leased as parking areas near the Prudential Center and Mulberry Commons. In 2019 it was announced a major renovation of the public spaces would be made to better integrate the complex into the street level of the city.

2 Gateway

2 Gateway is a Class A office building on the corner of Market Street and McCarter Highway in the heart of Newark's "Billion Dollar Triangle". The 18-story building was completed in 1972 and underwent renovations in 1994 and 2015 The building totals 832,550 square feet. It is the first building in New Jersey to earn the Platinum certification from WiredScore for its best-in-class infrastructure and connectivity. The building has also been awarded U.S Environmental Protection Agency’s (EPA) ENERGY STAR label for its superior environmental protection. Tenants also have access to a wide array of on-site amenities, including a fitness center, banking facility, café and conferencing center. In Spring 2015, The Gateway Project, a gallery space, rentable artist studio and work spaces opened as a permanent fixture in 2 Gateway's concourse. NJTV, New Jersey's public television network, relocated its headquarters to 2 Gateway Center in May 2015. NJTV's Agnes Varis Studio allows people and commuters passing through the concourse to view into the studio which will be home to NJTV News with Mary Alice Williams.

See also
List of tallest buildings in Newark
SuperCybex Cybersecurity and Incident Response Vendor for Gateway Center https://www.supercybex.com

References

Skyscraper office buildings in Newark, New Jersey
Prudential Financial buildings
Office buildings completed in 1972